The Mitsubishi advanced pressurized water reactor (APWR) is a generation III nuclear reactor design developed by Mitsubishi Heavy Industries (MHI) based on pressurized water reactor technology. It features several design enhancements including a neutron reflector, improved efficiency and improved safety systems. It has safety features advanced over the last generation, including a combination of passive and active systems. None are currently under construction.

History
The standard APWR is going through the licensing process in Japan and two (of 1538 MWe) are being constructed at the Tsuruga plant.  The next APWR+ will be of a 1700 MWe power and have full MOX core abilities.

The US-APWR was developed by MHI to modify their APWR design to comply with US regulations. TXU selected the US-APWR for use at multiple sites, including the Comanche Peak Nuclear Generating Station.
However, in 2013, Mitsubishi slowed U.S. certification work, and the application to build two units at Comanche was suspended.

The reactors are intended for use in nuclear power plants to produce nuclear power from nuclear fuel.

Plant parameters 

The US-APWR has several design features to improve plant economics.  The core is surrounded by a steel neutron reflector which increases reactivity and saves ~0.1wt% U-235 enrichment.  In addition, the US-APWR uses more advanced steam generators (compared to the APWR) which creates drier steam allowing for the use of higher efficiency (and more delicate) turbines.  This leads to a ~10% efficiency increase compared to the APWR.

Several safety improvements are also notable.  The safety systems have enhanced redundancy, utilizing 4 trains each capable of supplying 50% of the needed high pressure  makeup water instead of 2 trains capable of 100%.  Also, more reliance is placed on the accumulators which have been redesigned and increased in size.  The improvements in this passive system have led to the elimination of the Low Pressure Safety Injection system, an active system.

Units

Planned
In 2013, plans to build units in the U.S. were suspended:
TXUs Comanche Peak Nuclear Generating Station
North Anna Nuclear Generating Station unit 3

On 10 May 2011, Japanese Prime Minister Naoto Kan announced that Japan was cancelling plans for new nuclear construction, including the 2 proposed new APWR reactors at Tsuruga Nuclear Power Plant. As of 2014, under a new government, plans for Tsuruga were uncertain. In March 2015 the Nuclear Regulation Authority (NRA) accepted an expert report that concluded Tsuruga is on an active geological fault.

See also

Atmea
Mitsubishi FBR Systems
AP1000, the Westinghouse nuclear power plant

References

Nuclear power reactor types
Nuclear technology in Japan
APWR